Shooting Star (1999) is a Ned Kelly Award-winning novel by Australian author Peter Temple.

Dedication
"For Nicholas - with thanks for all the joy."

Plot

Awards

Ned Kelly Awards for Crime Writing, Best Novel, 2000: winner

Notes

This novel has also been published in Germany (in 2008 by Bertelsmann) and Poland (in 2009 by Amber).

Reviews

 "Australian Crime Fiction Database" 
 "Tangled Web" 

1999 Australian novels
Novels by Peter Temple
Ned Kelly Award-winning works